1st Bezlesnoye or Pervoye Bezlesnoye is a rural locality in Lebyazhensky Selsoviet Rural Settlement, Kursky District, Kursk Oblast, Russia. Population:

Geography 
The village is located on the Mlodat River (a left tributary of the Seym), 88 km from the Russia–Ukraine border, 13 km south-east of Kursk, 3.5 km from the selsoviet center – Cheryomushki.

 Climate
1st Bezlesnoye has a warm-summer humid continental climate (Dfb in the Köppen climate classification).

Transport 
1st Bezlesnoye is located 4.5 km from the road of intermunicipal significance  (Kursk – Petrin), 1 km from the road  (38N-416 – 2nd Bezlesnoye), 8 km from the nearest railway halt Zaplava (railway line Klyukva — Belgorod).

The rural locality is situated 17.5 km from Kursk Vostochny Airport, 107 km from Belgorod International Airport and 203 km from Voronezh Peter the Great Airport.

References

Notes

Sources

Rural localities in Kursky District, Kursk Oblast